The Gray Man is a 2022 American action thriller film directed by Anthony and Joe Russo, from a screenplay the latter co-wrote with Christopher Markus and Stephen McFeely, based on the 2009 novel of the same name by Mark Greaney. The film stars Ryan Gosling, Chris Evans, Ana de Armas, Jessica Henwick, Regé-Jean Page, Wagner Moura, Julia Butters, Dhanush, Alfre Woodard, and Billy Bob Thornton. Produced by the Russo brothers' company, AGBO, it is the first film in a franchise based upon Greaney's Gray Man novels. The plot centers on CIA agent "Sierra Six", who is on the run from sociopathic ex-CIA agent and mercenary Lloyd Hansen upon discovering corrupt secrets about his superior.

An adaptation of Greaney's novel was originally announced in 2011, with James Gray set to direct Brad Pitt, and later Charlize Theron in a gender-swapped role, though neither version ever came to fruition. The property lingered in development hell until July 2020, when it was announced the Russo brothers would direct, with both Gosling and Evans attached to star. Filming took place in Los Angeles, Paris and Prague between March and July 2021. With a production budget of $200 million, it is among the most expensive films made by Netflix.

The Gray Man began a limited theatrical release on July 15, 2022 followed by its digital release on Netflix on July 22, 2022. It received mixed reviews from critics, with praise for the ensemble cast and action sequences, but criticism toward the "clichéd script and breakneck pacing." The film is being followed by a sequel, with Gosling reprising his role, as well as a spin-off.

Plot
In 2003, senior CIA official Donald Fitzroy visits a prisoner named Courtland Gentry in Florida. Eight years earlier, Gentry was a minor convicted of killing his abusive father to protect his brother. Fitzroy offers him his freedom in exchange for working as an assassin in the CIA's Sierra program.

In 2021, Gentry, now known as Sierra Six, is working with fellow CIA agent Dani Miranda to assassinate a target suspected of selling off national security secrets in Bangkok during the national Songkran festival. He is unable to do so stealthily without harming civilians and attacks the target directly, mortally wounding him. Before dying, the target reveals that he worked in the Sierra program as Sierra Four, and hands Six an encrypted drive detailing the corruption of CIA official Denny Carmichael, who is the lead agent on the assassination mission. Carmichael is elusive about the true purpose of the mission and the contents of the drive when confronted by Six, and Six refuses evacuation from Bangkok with Carmichael's men. He sends the drive to former Sierra Program handler Margaret Cahill in Prague, and calls a now-retired Fitzroy to request extraction. Carmichael hires mercenary Lloyd Hansen, an ex-CIA agent kicked out of the agency for his sociopathic tendencies, to track down Six and retrieve the drive. Hansen does so by kidnapping Fitzroy's niece Claire, forcing Fitzroy to authorize Six's murder by the extraction team. However, Six kills them and escapes.

Frustrated, Carmichael sends his subordinate Suzanne Brewer to oversee Hansen and keep him in line. Hansen keeps Claire hostage in a mansion in Croatia, where he has based his operations. Hansen also puts a bounty on Six's head to attract mercenaries and assassins to hunt him down. Six heads to Vienna to find Claire's pacemaker's serial number from Laszlo Sosa, but Sosa betrays him for the bounty. Six escapes just as Hansen arrives with his team, and is rescued by Miranda. Miranda's reputation is in tatters following the Bangkok mission and she initially plans to bring him in to salvage her career at the CIA. Six convinces her to drive him to Cahill's apartment in Prague, where she decrypts the drive, which reveals the extent of Carmichael's corruption on behalf of a mysterious benefactor working for a shadow government. Hansen sends several teams of assassins to Cahill's home, and the terminally ill Cahill blows up her home to give Six and Miranda a chance to escape.

Six is arrested and handcuffed in the square. A shootout in the streets of Prague follows killing all the police present and Six escapes on a tram. A long chase and gun battle ensues, and Six is saved by Miranda, in Cahill's bulletproof car. The two infiltrate a hospital to track down Claire through the wireless signal broadcast from her pacemaker. The mercenary "Lone Wolf" steals the drive from them, knocking them out, and brings the drive to Hansen. Six and  Miranda follow the pacemaker to Hansen's base. Miranda creates a distraction while Six infiltrates the mansion and rescues Fitzroy and Claire. Fitzroy is mortally wounded as they flee and sacrifices himself in a failed attempt to kill Hansen. Miranda knocks out Hansen's men, but Lone Wolf narrowly escapes. He defeats Miranda in a fight but gives her the drive, having become disgusted with Hansen's willingness to kill children and his lack of morals.

Hansen manages to take Claire hostage and drags her into a hedge maze. After a standoff, Hansen lets go of Claire and fights with Six. Before Six can kill him, Hansen is shot and killed by Brewer, who tells Six that she plans to pin Carmichael's actions on Hansen in order to gain leverage over him. Furthermore, Brewer pledges Claire's safety but only if Six continues to work for the CIA. Six and Miranda are forced to co-operate in the cover-up, where ultimately no action is taken against Carmichael.  After the debriefing at the CIA headquarters, Miranda threatens to kill Carmichael if any harm comes to Claire. Six escapes custody and frees Claire, who is being held at a secret location.

Cast

In addition, Callan Mulvey appears as Dining Car ( Four) at the start of the film, setting the plot in motion.

Production

Development
The project was first set up at New Regency, with James Gray set to direct a screenplay written by Adam Cozad in January 2011. Brad Pitt was initially cast to star, but by October 2015 he and Gray were no longer involved with the film. Charlize Theron entered talks to star in a gender-swapped version of the film at Sony Pictures, with Anthony and Joe Russo writing the screenplay.

Casting
No further development was announced until July 2020, when the Russo brothers were announced to direct the film, from a screenplay by Joe Russo, Christopher Markus and Stephen McFeely, with additional material written by Anna Gregory, Charles Leavitt, Rhett Reese, Joe Schrapnel, and Paul Wernick, for Netflix, with the intention to spawn a franchise. Ryan Gosling and Chris Evans were cast to star in the film. In December, Ana de Armas, Jessica Henwick, Wagner Moura, Julia Butters and Dhanush were added to the cast. Regé-Jean Page, Billy Bob Thornton, Alfre Woodard, Eme Ikwuakor, and Scott Haze joined the cast in March 2021. An April article about shooting in Prague had Michael Gandolfini included in the cast. In May 2021, DeObia Oparei joined the cast of the film.

Filming
Filming was to commence on January 18, 2021, in Long Beach, California, but was pushed back to March 1. Page wrapped his role within the first month of shooting. It filmed in Europe in the spring, with locations including Prague, Czech Republic, the Château de Chantilly in France, Croatia and as well as in Baku, Azerbaijan. Filming in Prague took place from June 27, 2021. Filming wrapped on July 31, 2021.

Music

The film's score was composed by Henry Jackman, who previously collaborated with the Russos on several of their films. Jackman began writing the score in December 2021, beginning with a 17-minute-long suite.

Release
The Gray Man began a limited theatrical release on July 15, 2022, followed by its release on Netflix on July 22, 2022. Though Netflix does not report theatrical grosses for its titles, distribution insiders estimated the film made around $200,000 from about 400 theaters in its opening weekend. IndieWire estimated the film made $300,000–375,000 over its first full week of theatrical release.

Reception

Viewership
Netflix reported the film was streamed for a total of 88.55 million hours over its first three days, which would equal around 43.55 million viewers. It was the most-watched film in 84 countries. By September the film had totaled 253.8 million hours viewed.

Critical response

Accolades
The film was nominated for Outstanding Supporting Visual Effects in a Photoreal Feature at the 21st Visual Effects Society Awards.

Future

Sequel
Scott Stuber, head of original films on Netflix, expressed his interest in future Gray Man films, saying: "We're excited to continue to partner with the Russo brothers and the team at AGBO as they build out The Gray Man universe." After the film's debut weekend, a sequel was announced with Gosling and the Russo brothers returning to their respective roles.

Spin-off
A spin-off film, which will explore a different element of The Gray Man universe, will be written by Paul Wernick and Rhett Reese. Russo Brothers stated that they are considering to make a spin-off film about Dhanush's character Avik San (The Lone Wolf).

References

External links
  on Netflix
 
 

The Gray Man
2020s chase films
2020s English-language films
2022 action thriller films
American action thriller films
American chase films
English-language Netflix original films
Film productions suspended due to the COVID-19 pandemic
Films about the Central Intelligence Agency
Films about terrorism in Europe
Films based on American thriller novels
Films directed by Anthony and Joe Russo
Films produced by Joe Roth
Films scored by Henry Jackman
Films set in 2003
Films set in 2021
Films shot in France
Films set in Bangkok
Films set in Baku
Films set in Berlin
Films set in Croatia
Films set in Hong Kong
Films set in Langley, Virginia
Films set in London
Films set in Monaco
Films set in Prague
Films set in Turkey
Films set in Vienna
Films set in Virginia
Films set in Washington, D.C.
Films shot in Los Angeles County, California
Films shot in Prague
Films shot in Croatia
Films with screenplays by Christopher Markus and Stephen McFeely
2020s American films
Techno-thriller films